Bill Day (born 21 January 1934) is an Australian former alpine skier who competed in the 1952, 1956 and 1960 Winter Olympics.

References

External links
 

1934 births
Australian male alpine skiers
Alpine skiers at the 1952 Winter Olympics
Alpine skiers at the 1956 Winter Olympics
Alpine skiers at the 1960 Winter Olympics
Olympic alpine skiers of Australia
Place of birth missing (living people)
Living people